W. Craig Biddle (July 4, 1931 - September 23, 2018) was an American politician in the state of California. He served in the California State Assembly for the 74th district from 1965 to 1972, and in the California State Senate for the 36th district from 1972 to 1974.

References

1931 births
2018 deaths
Republican Party members of the California State Assembly
Republican Party California state senators
20th-century American politicians